Michael McMahon, Mike McMahon or Michael MacMahon may refer to:

 Brent McMahon (wheelchair racer) (Michael Brent McMahon, born 1966), Canadian Paralympic athlete
 Michael MacMahon (politician) (1854–1931), Australian politician
 Michael Peter MacMahon (1720–1807), Irish Dominican friar
 Michael McMahon (born 1957), American politician and attorney
 Michael McMahon (rugby union) (1889–c. 1961), Australian rugby union player
 Michael McMahon (Scottish politician) (born 1961), Scottish politician
 Mike McMahon (American football) (born 1979), American football player
 Mike McMahon (Australian rules footballer) (1902–1962), Australian rules footballer
 Mike McMahon (comics) (born 1954), British comics illustrator
 Mike McMahon (professor), English surgeon
 Mike McMahon Sr. (1915–1974), Canadian ice hockey player
 Mike McMahon Jr. (1941–2013), his son, Canadian ice hockey player

See also
 Mike McMahan, American writer and producer